Harry Garvin Truby (May 12, 1870 – March 21, 1953), was an infielder in the Major Leagues in 1895 and 1896. Truby played for the Chicago Colts and Pittsburgh Pirates.

In 70 games over two seasons, Truby posted a .281 batting average (73-for-260) with 31 runs, 2 home runs and 50 RBI. He recorded a .944 fielding percentage as a second baseman.

External links

1870 births
1953 deaths
Major League Baseball second basemen
Chicago Colts players
Pittsburgh Pirates players
19th-century baseball players
Minor league baseball managers
Austin Senators players
Rockford Hustlers players
Mobile Blackbirds players
Nashville Tigers players
Memphis Giants players
Norfolk Clam Eaters players
Roanoke Magicians players
Rockford Forest City players
Rockford Reds players
Grand Rapids Gold Bugs players
Toronto Canadians players
Albany Senators players
Peoria Blackbirds players
Rockford Forest Citys (minor league) players
Kansas City Blues (baseball) players
Dayton Old Soldiers players
Peoria Distillers players
Youngstown Little Giants players
Mansfield Haymakers players
Marion Glass Blowers players
Hartford Senators players
Bloomington Bloomers players
Augusta Tourists players
Savannah Pathfinders players
Baseball players from Ohio